Frank O’Mara (born 1960 in Limerick) is a former Irish runner. A three-time Olympian, he was twice World Indoor Champion in the 3000m. O’Mara has post-graduate degrees from the University of Arkansas and had a successful career in the wireless industry.

Early life

O’Mara began his athletics career at age 10, finishing 3rd in the All-Ireland 400m. He attended JFK primary school and St. Munchins College, where he played rugby. O’Mara won the Irish schools 1500m in a championship record of 3:58.2. His victory that day led St. Munchin's to win the team title.

College Athletics
O’Mara received a scholarship to the University of Arkansas, where he studied engineering. While there, he ran 3:40.5 in Houston, TX in 1983 to become only the third Irishman to ever win the NCAA 1500m. That same year, he was on the first University of Arkansas team to win a Championship of America title at the Penn Relays, where he anchored the distance medley relay. He also anchored the 4 × 1500 m relay team to victory and was named the Penn Relays’ most valuable track performer. That summer he ran 3:52.50 at the Cork City Sports and was a semi-finalist at the inaugural world championships in Helsinki. In 1997, he was inducted into the University of Arkansas Sports Hall of Honor.

Athletics career

Primarily a miler early on, O’Mara set a personal best in 1985 for the 1500m, finishing second at the Ivo Van Dame Invitational with a time of 3:34.02. Three weeks later, he won the Fifth Avenue Mile in an impressive 3:52.28. He set his personal best for the mile when finishing 4th in the 1986 Grand prix final in Rome with a time of 3:51.06. He finished 8th at the European Championship in Stuttgart in the 1500m race won by Steve Cram ahead of Sebastian Coe.  Also that summer, he was a member of the Irish quartet of Coghlan, O’Sullivan and Flynn who broke the World 4 x 1 Mile record, becoming
the first team to break 16 minutes, setting a new mark of 15:49.08.

In 1987, O’Mara broke the Irish record for 5,000m, finishing third place at the Bislett Games in Oslo. His time of 13:13.02 stood as the national record for 11 years. A finalist at the 1987 World Championship in Rome, he placed 9th behind the winner Saïd Aouita.  He competed in three Olympic Games, finishing 4th in the preliminary rounds of the 1500m at the 1984 Summer Olympics in Los Angeles and fourth in his heat of the 5000m at the 1992 Summer Olympics in Barcelona, narrowly missing the next round.

O’Mara's two major victories in the 3000m happened during World Indoor Championships. At Indianapolis in 1987, he won a tactical race in 8:03.32, beating fellow countryman Paul Donovan, who placed second. In 1989, he failed to defend his title at Budapest, finishing 5th behind Saïd Aouita. That same year, he edged out close friend Marcus O’Sullivan to win the US Indoor Championships at Madison Square Garden. But in 1991, he reclaimed his title with a dominating performance in Seville. Leading at the bell, he easily pulled away from Hammou Boutayeb in a championship record of 7:41.14,  which was the third fastest time ever run.

On five occasions, O’Mara was Irish national champion, and in 2015 he was inducted into the Irish Athletics Hall of Fame in 2015.

Business career

After earning a Bachelor of Science in Civil Engineering, he served as an assistant coach for the University of Arkansas and was on the coaching staff when Arkansas won its first NCAA Triple Crown in 1985. He continued his education and received an MBA and a JD. He was admitted to the Arkansas Bar in 1993. He was an RTE track & field commentator from 1995 to 2000, during which he covered the Atlanta and Sydney Olympics.

He began his business career as lawyer for Alltel Wireless in Little Rock, Arkansas in 1996. He held various executive roles at Alltel, including EVP of Human Resources and EVP of Customer Service. However, his tenure as Chief Marketing Officer was most notable.  During that period, Alltel changed its logo and rebranded over 800 retail locations and 3,000 agent locations, launched a ground breaking product called My Circle  and implemented a national, award-winning advertising campaign featuring the rival company's sales guys.  In January 2009, Verizon purchased Alltel for $28.1 billion.

O’Mara was named CEO of Allied Wireless, a subsidiary of Atlantic Tele Network (ATW) in September 2009. Atlantic Tele-Network (ATN) bought former Alltel markets from Verizon. ATN also bought the Alltel brand, enabling Allied to operate as Alltel in the acquired markets. O’Mara built a team of largely former Alltel colleagues, who successfully completed major systems, network, and customer support conversions. In 2013, ATN sold Allied Wireless to AT&T. During his tenure as CEO, O’Mara was a member of the executive committee of the board of CTIA (the wireless trade association).

Personal Bests

Achievements

References

External links
St Munchin's College
 
www.awcc.com

1960 births
Living people
Sportspeople from Limerick (city)
Irish male middle-distance runners
Irish male long-distance runners
Athletes (track and field) at the 1984 Summer Olympics
Athletes (track and field) at the 1988 Summer Olympics
Athletes (track and field) at the 1992 Summer Olympics
Olympic athletes of Ireland
University of Arkansas people
Arkansas Razorbacks men's track and field athletes
People educated at St Munchin's College
World Athletics Championships athletes for Ireland
Arkansas Razorbacks track and field coaches
Arkansas Razorbacks cross country coaches
World Athletics Indoor Championships winners